Low Wassie Creek is a stream in northern Oregon County in the Ozarks of southern Missouri.

Low Wassie Creek derives its name from the extinct community of Hiwassie.

See also
List of rivers of Missouri

References

Rivers of Oregon County, Missouri
Rivers of Missouri